Max Clarenbach (19 May 1880 – 9 July 1952) was a German painter. His work was part of the art competitions at the 1928 Summer Olympics and the 1932 Summer Olympics.

References

External links
 

1880 births
1952 deaths
20th-century German painters
20th-century German male artists
German male painters
Olympic competitors in art competitions
People from Neuss